Endoscopic stenting is a medical procedure by which a stent, a hollow device designed to prevent constriction or collapse of a tubular organ, is inserted by endoscopy. They are usually inserted when a disease process has led to narrowing or obstruction of the organ in question, such as the esophagus or the colon.

There are various types of endoscopic stents: plastic stents, uncovered self-expandable metallic stents, partially covered self-expandable metallic stents, and fully covered self-expandable metallic stents. Self-expandable metallic stents "play an important role in the management of malignant obstructing lesions in the gastrointestinal tract."

A stent may be inserted into the common bile duct during an endoscopic retrograde cholangiopancreatography, especially if gallstone removal is deemed too risky.

Complications
Some complications of metallic stents are: stent migration (occurring in 20 to 40% of the cases). Stents with anchoring flaps or flared ends can reduce the risk of migration. Cholecystitis can be a complication for stenting of malignant biliary stricture. Stent occlusion may occur from tumor or tissue overgrowth, or due to sludge deposits, causing the development of cholangitis.

References 

Endoscopy
Digestive system surgery